John W. Seling (died February 20, 1986) was an American politician and fireman from Maryland. He served as a member of the Maryland House of Delegates, representing District 9 from 1977 to 1978.

Early life
John W. Seling was born in Rosedale, Maryland.

Career
In 1940, Seling joined the Baltimore County Fire Department. He reached the rank of captain and retired in 1965.

Seling was a Democrat. In 1974, Seling was elected to the Baltimore County State Central Committee. In 1977, he was appointed to the Maryland House of Delegates, representing District 9, to replace Louis Einschutz. He served until 1978, deciding not to run again.

Seling served as a member of the board of directors of the Fairmount Savings and Loan Association.

Personal life
Seling married Amelia Solba in 1934. They had two sons and two daughters, John W. Jr., George F., Barbara E. and Anna T. He was a member of St. Clement's Catholic Church.

Seling died on February 20, 1986, at the age of 76, at his winter home in Satellite Beach, Florida. He was buried at Gardens of Faith Cemetery in Rosedale.

References

Year of birth missing
1986 deaths
People from Baltimore County, Maryland
Democratic Party members of the Maryland House of Delegates
American firefighters